Adam Johan Frederik Poulsen Trampe (1798–1876) was a Dano-Norwegian lawyer and politician.  He served as the County Governor of Nordlands amt from 1829 until 1833 and then as the County Governor of Nordre Trondhjems amt from 1833 until 1857.

Personal life
Adam Johan Frederik Poulsen was born on 10 September 1798 in Copenhagen, Denmark.  He was the son of Frederich Christopher Trampe, Count of Trampe from the noble Trampe family. The Count became a naturalized citizen of Norway in 1814, and during his lifetime had the public recognition of his title. This, however, did not apply to any of his children, since they were all born after the 1821 Nobility Law.  He was one of the last legally recognized counts of Norway.  He was the grandfather of Adam Fredrik Trampe Bødtker.

Education and career
He graduated from the Trondheim Cathedral School in 1818 and then earned his Cand.jur. degree in 1821. In 1826 he became a police chief in Trondheim. In 1829, he was appointed to be the County Governor of Nordlands amt, a position that he held until 1833 when he was appointed as the County Governor of Nordre Trondhjems amt.  He retired from the governorship in 1857.

During his lifetime, he held honorary positions in the Swedish-Norwegian Court.  He was a Chamberlain and later he was the senior Valet de chambre for the 1860 coronation of King Karl IV.

References

1798 births
1876 deaths
County governors of Norway
County governors of Nordland